Tilted Donut Wedge with Two Balls is an outdoor sculpture by Fletcher Benton, installed at Besselpark in Berlin, Germany.

References

External links

 

Friedrichshain-Kreuzberg
Outdoor sculptures in Berlin